is the third studio album by Japanese singer-songwriter Miho Komatsu. It was released on 16 February 2000 under Giza Studio.

Background
This is her first album released under new recording label Giza Studio which she moved in April, 1999.

The album includes 3 previously released singles, Sayonara no Kakera, Saitan Kyori de and Kaze ga Soyogu Basho. Although her 7th single was released in her previous label Amemura records, 8th single was released in late spring under Giza.

Saitan Kyori has received completely new instrumentation for this album, it doesn't include subtitle. Compared to the single version, the intro starts more quietly and drum solo was completely cut off.

The song "As" has later received re-arranged version in her single Anata ga Iru Kara as b-side track. The song Boyfriend from single Sayonara no Kakera as b-side track was included in this album as well.

Some songs from the album, included Ame ga Furu Tabi ni, Boyfriend, Yume to Genjitsu no Hazama and As were released in her conceptual album Lyrics in 2003.

Takeshi Hayama, the famous arranger in Being Inc. who provided arrangements for many popular artist including Zard, was involved in album production along with Kūron Oshiro and Masato Kitano.

Charting
The album reached #5 in its first week with 72,180 sold copies. Album charted for 5 weeks and sold more than 100,000 copies in total.

Track listing

In media
Kaze ga Soyogu Basho
for Anime television series Monster Rancher as opening theme
Sayonara no Kakera
for TV Asahi variety program Paku2 Gurumenbo as ending theme
Saitan Kyori de
for Tokyo Broadcasting System Television variety program Rank Oukoku as opening theme
BEAUTIFUL LIFE
for TV Asahi program Yajiuma Wide as ending theme

References

2000 albums
Miho Komatsu songs
Songs written by Miho Komatsu
2000 songs
1999 songs
Giza Studio albums
Being Inc. albums
Japanese-language albums
Albums produced by Daiko Nagato